Frank Winterstein (born 17 December 1986) is an Australian international rugby league footballer who plays as a  forward for Toulouse Olympique in the Betfred Championship.

Winterstein previously played for the Canterbury-Bankstown Bulldogs, Manly-Warringah Sea Eagles and the Penrith Panthers in the National Rugby League (NRL), and for the Wakefield Trinity Wildcats, Crusaders Rugby League and the Widnes Vikings in the Super League.

He played rugby union for the Kintetsu Liners in the Top League and the Australian rugby sevens team.

Background
He was born in Canterbury, New South Wales, Australia.

Playing career
Winterstein previously played for Wakefield Trinity and the Canterbury-Bankstown Bulldogs in the NRL.  Winterstein made his first grade debut for Canterbury-Bankstown in Round 13 2008 at ANZ Stadium against the Newcastle Knights.  Winterstein made five appearances in his debut season as Canterbury endured a horror season on the field finishing last on the table and claimed the wooden spoon.

Winterstein later signed a two-year deal at Super League newcomers Widnes.

Bradford Bulls
In October 2013, Winterstein signed a one-year deal with the Bradford Bulls while he was playing in the 2013 Rugby League World Cup with Samoa. He was released by mutual consent in January 2014, without having appeared for the club.

Rugby union
In March 2016, Winterstein joined the Australian rugby sevens squad. He appeared at the 2016 Hong Kong Sevens, 2016 Singapore Sevens and 2016 London Sevens.

Manly Warringah Sea Eagles
Winterstein returned to rugby league in August 2016, signing with the Manly Warringah Sea Eagles effective immediately until the end of 2017. In July 2017, Winterstein extended his contract with the Sea Eagles until the end of 2019.

Penrith Panthers
At the start of the 2019 NRL season, Winterstein was released by Manly-Warringah and he signed a contract to join Penrith.  Winterstein made his debut for Penrith in round two against Newcastle, scoring a try in a 16–14 victory at the Newcastle International Sports Centre.

On 16 September 2019, it was revealed that Winterstein was one of ten players who were to be released by the Penrith club at the end of the 2019 NRL season.

Toulouse Olympique
At the end of the 2019 season, the 32-year-old was not offered another Australian contract. He then signed a two-year deal with the French rugby league team Toulouse Olympique for the European 2020/21 seasons.

On 22 Jan 2021, it was reported that he had left the club by mutual consent

Representative career
Winterstein has represented Samoa internationally, first playing in the Federation Shield in 2005.

Personal life
Also see :Category:Tuimavave family.

Winterstein is the cousin of North Queensland Cowboys winger Antonio Winterstein. He is married to social media influencer and anti-vaccination activist Taylor Winterstein.

References

External links

Penrith Panthers profile
 Manly Sea Eagles profile
 2017 RLWC profile
 

1986 births
Living people
Australian people of German descent
Australian sportspeople of Samoan descent
Australian rugby league players
Australian rugby union players
Canterbury-Bankstown Bulldogs players
Crusaders Rugby League players
Expatriate rugby union players in Japan
Hanazono Kintetsu Liners players
Manly Warringah Sea Eagles players
Penrith Panthers players
Rugby league centres
Rugby league players from New South Wales
Rugby league second-rows
Samoa national rugby league team captains
Samoa national rugby league team players
Samoan rugby league players
Toulouse Olympique players
Frank
Wakefield Trinity players
Widnes Vikings players